Tan Yubao (1899 – January 10, 1980) was a Chinese communist. He was born in Chaling County, Zhuzhou, Hunan Province. He was chairman (1935-1937) of the communist base (Soviet) on the border of Hunan and Jiangxi Provinces. He once intervened to save the life of Hu Yaobang. He was a delegate to the 3rd (1964-1975) and 4th (1975-1978) National People's Congress and a member of the Standing Committee for the 5th (1978-1983) National People's Congress. He was a member of the Chinese People's Political Consultative Conference.

External links
 
 

1899 births
1980 deaths
Chinese communists
People from Zhuzhou
Members of the 1st Chinese People's Political Consultative Conference
Delegates to the 3rd National People's Congress
Delegates to the 4th National People's Congress
Members of the Standing Committee of the 5th National People's Congress